Air Perú International S.A.C. was a proposed Peruvian airline to be based in Lima, Peru. It planned to operate scheduled domestic and international services to Asia, Europe, South America and the United States. Its main base would have been Jorge Chávez International Airport.

By September 2009, there had been no news on the airline and all plans seem to have ceased. The airline's trademark registration expired in 2017.

Destinations

Air Perú planned to serve the following destinations:

Cuzco (Alejandro Velasco Astete International Airport)
Iquitos (Crnl. FAP Francisco Secada Vignetta International Airport)
Lima (Jorge Chávez International Airport) Hub

In December 2007, Air Perú flew charter flights to Miami and Washington, D.C. operated for Primaris Airlines.

Fleet
Air Perú planned to operate 2 Boeing 757-200s. Only one was seen in its livery, but was returned to its lessor; Primaris Airlines.

See also
USGlobal Airways - another proposed airline
Family Airlines - another proposed airline

External links

 Official launch of Air Perú
 Article on Air Perú

Defunct airlines of Peru
Airlines established in 2006
Airlines disestablished in 2009
Proposed airlines